Tubulin-specific chaperone D is a protein that in humans is encoded by the TBCD gene.

Function 

Cofactor D is one of four proteins (cofactors A, D, E, and C) involved in the pathway leading to correctly folded beta-tubulin from folding intermediates. Cofactors A and D are believed to play a role in capturing and stabilizing beta-tubulin intermediates in a quasi-native confirmation. Cofactor E binds to the cofactor D/beta-tubulin complex; interaction with cofactor C then causes the release of beta-tubulin polypeptides that are committed to the native state.

Interactions 

TBCD has been shown to interact with ARL2.

References

Further reading